Indian Army Ranks can be broadly classified into three categories: Commissioned Officers, Junior Commissioned Officers and Other Ranks.

These ranks generally correspond with those of the British Indian Army. Traditional names for ranks are still used.

History
Upon independence in 1947, India became a dominion within the British Commonwealth of Nations, but the old rank insignia, incorporating the Tudor Crown and four-pointed Bath Star ('pip'), was retained, as King George VI remained Commander-in-Chief of the Indian Armed Forces. Until 26 January 1950, when India became a republic, the Indian Army utilised the British-pattern rank badges of the British Indian Army.
After 26 January 1950, when India became a republic, the President of India became Commander-in-Chief, and the Lion Capital of Ashoka (the State Emblem of India) replaced the crown, with a five-pointed star being substituted for the 'pip'.

Field Marshal

India has a Field Marshal rank, but it is mostly ceremonial. There are no Field Marshals in the army organizational structure at present and it has been conferred on only two officers in the past, the late Field Marshal Sam Manekshaw and the late Field Marshal K. M. Cariappa.

Field Marshals hold their rank for life and are considered to be serving officers until their death. Unlike other officers, they do not draw a pension. A Field Marshal gets the full pay of a general equal to the Chief of the Army Staff. They wear full uniforms on all official occasions.

Ranks and insignia

Ranks
Officers

Other ranks

 The title Risaldar replaces Subedar in ranks in cavalry, armored regiments, Remount Veterinary Corps and animal transport battalions of Army Service Corps.
 Naib Risaldar was called Jemadar until 1965.
 Daffadar, Lance Daffadar and Acting Lance Daffadar - these ranks replace the titles of Havildar, Naik and Lance Naik in cavalry, armored regiments, Remount Veterinary Corps and animal transport battalions of Army Service Corps.
 Sowar replaces the rank Sepoy in cavalry, armored regiments, Remount Veterinary Corps and animal transport battalions of Army Service Corps.

Ranks that are no longer in use
The rank of Second Lieutenant is no longer in use; all new officers are commissioned as Lieutenants.

The appointments of Regimental Quartermaster Havildar and Regimental Havildar Major are no longer used in the Indian Army (except for the Regiment of Artillery and Army Air Defence) and those duties are now performed by JCOs.

Notable holders include 2Lt. Arun Khetarpal, 2Lt. Rama Raghoba Rane, CHM Piru Singh Shekhawat and CQMH Abdul Hamid.

Rank descriptions
Indian Army Ranks can be classified into three categories.
Commissioned Officers who are equivalent to All India Services & Group "A" Service officers.
Junior Commissioned Officers who are equivalent to Group B Gazetted officers.
Other Ranks comprising non-commissioned officers and soldiers.

Commissioned officers

Commissioned officers are the leaders of the army and command anywhere from Platoon, Company, Battalion, Brigade, Division, Corps and the whole army.

At the time of joining, all Indian Army officers are inducted as officer cadets. The rank of officer cadet is denoted by an officer's uniform with no insignia.

Indian Army officers are continually put through different courses and assessed on merit throughout their career, for promotions and appointments. Substantive promotions up to Lieutenant Colonel or equivalent (subject to clearance of Part B and Part D exam for Major and Lieutenant Colonel) and are based on time in service whereas those for Colonel and above are based on selection, with promotion to Colonel also based on time served. Due to steep hierarchy and few vacancies, most of the officers retire at the rank of Colonel and only a few make it to the rank of Brigadier and above. Civilian equivalents are in accordance with government policies on functional allocation of duties in staff billets, otherwise the rank structure of the armed forces is different from the civilian with regard to years of service and vacancies available.

Indian Army officers undergo various courses such as Young Officers Course, Junior Command Course, Defence Services Staff College course at DSSC Wellington, Management Development Programme: Senior Defence Management Course, Higher Defence Management Course at the College of Defence Management (Secunderabad), Higher Command Courses, NDC courses at various premier institutions of Armed Forces for promotions. The same is applicable to officers other two services namely Indian Navy and Indian Air Force

Dress insignia are in Gold/Black/Silver based on regiments of the officers commissioned

In the Indian Army, officer cadets are known as Gentlemen Cadets or Lady Cadets. Gentlemen Cadets (GCs) join the Indian Military Academy (IMA)/Officer's Training Academy (OTA) after going through the Service Selection Board (S.S.B.) interview. Gentlemen Cadets undergo a pre-commission training programme at IMA/OTA, which is equally divided into terms.

Junior commissioned officers
Junior commissioned officers are promoted from non-commissioned officers and are broadly equivalent to warrant officers in the British Army. Senior non-commissioned officers are promoted to JCO rank on the basis of merit and seniority, restricted by the number of vacancies. In between the Commissioned Officer and the NCOs lies the Junior Commissioned Officers. They are treated with great respect as they have a minimum of 28 yrs and over service and are referred to as Sahab by all ranks. 

The current living recipients of the Param Veer Chakra are all from JCO ranks namely Bana Singh Retd, Sanjay Kumar, and Yogendra Singh Yadav.

JCOs are entrusted with supervisory roles and the three JCO ranks are Subedar Major, Subedar and Naib Subedar. JCOs are equivalent in status to Group B (Gazetted) of Government of India. 

Junior commissioned officers are treated as a separate class and hold many additional privileges. In the army, they have a separate mess (the JCO's mess), get well-furnished family quarters, and are authorized to travel in AC II-tier on the railways.

JCOs are currently enrolled as jawans and few of them get promoted to officers over a period of time-based on their performance and on their ability to clear promotion examinations. A few JCOs are directly enrolled as religious teachers and in certain technical arms such as the Corps of Engineers. As of 2021, the Indian Army is discussing a proposal to directly enrol Junior Commissioned Officers (JCOs) in all arms of the service to address the shortage of commissioned officers. According to the proposal, the Indian Army will directly induct JCOs who have cleared the Services Selection Board (SSB) interview. The UPSC will conduct an entrance examination, which would be followed by an SSB interview and a medical examination. Selected candidates would then be trained for one and a half years before joining the units as JCOs. Subsequently, they would be promoted to officers up to the rank of Colonels based on their length of service and qualifications.

Other ranks
Other ranks in the Indian Army include Non-Commissioned Officers ("NCOs") and Soldiers ("sepoys" or "jawans")

Non commissioned officers
Non-Commissioned Officers ("NCOs") are soldiers promoted to positions of responsibility and are equivalent to junior non-commissioned officers (sergeants and corporals) in Western armies.

Soldiers

A sepoy is a rank equivalent to Private in most Commonwealth armies. Many regiments and corps use other distinctive and descriptive names instead of sepoys. These distinctive equivalents for Sepoy include:

Honorary ranks

Brevet 
Honorary ranks and honour, also called brevet, are granted in the Indian Army, and its branches such as India Territorial Army (TA), for various reasons. These ranks may not entitle the rank holder to pay, pension, or perks (e.g. ranks given to celebrities).

Retiring Soldiers 
Since the time of the British raj, exemplary soldiers who are about to retire are given honorary ranks, usually a few days before their retirement, although these ranks can be granted at any time. Examples include the grant of the rank of Field Marshal, which is rarely granted. Most frequently, honorary ranks that are granted are those of junior commissioned officers, which are granted 1 or 2 weeks before retirement.

Prominent citizens as brand ambassadors 
In order to inspire Indian youths to join the Indian Army, and to acknowledge contribution towards the nation, honorary ranks are awarded to the accomplished and eminent personalities who act as brand ambassadors for the defence forces. The following were awarded honorary titles:
 
 Indian Army's Territorial Army (TA)

 Kapil Dev, 2008, Lieutenant Colonel, TA, cricketer. 
 Mohanlal Viswanathan, 2009, Lieutenant Colonel, TA (Madras Regiment), Malayalam actor and filmmaker.
 Mahendra Singh Dhoni, 2011, Lieutenant Colonel, TA (Para), cricketer.
 Abhinav Bindra, 2011, Lieutenant Colonel, TA (Sikh Regiment), sport shooter and politician.
Deepak Rao, 2011, Major, TA (Para), military trainer and author.

Foreign trainees of India's military academies 

Trainees of foreign nations who are trained by the military academies of India, such as the National Defence Academy (NDA) or the Indian Military Academy (IMA), are sometimes awarded honorary ranks in the Indian Army. The trainees are usually from friendly armies, such as the Singapore Army.

Reciprocal awarding of honorary ranks to other nations

Nepal 

Since 1950, when former Indian Army Chief General K. M. Cariappa visited Nepal, awarding the highest reciprocal honorary ranks to the newly appointed serving chiefs of each other's armies is a practice followed by India and Nepal. For example, in 2009 the newly appointed Nepal Army Chief General Chhatra Man Singh Gurung was decorated with the honorary rank of General of the Indian army at Rashtrapati Bhavan in New Delhi by the President of India who is also the Supreme Commander of Indian Army. Similarly, in 2010 the newly appointed Indian Army Chief General V. K. Singh was awarded the honorary rank of General of Nepal Army at Shital Niwas in Kathmandu by the President of Nepal who is also the Supreme Commander of Nepal Army.

British Colonial era: Indian Army ranks to British Army 

Some members of the ruling families of Princely states were given ceremonial honorary ranks during the colonial era.

An 1832 journal reports that during the colonial British raj era, the Commander-in-Chief of British Army (ex officio role of the serving Monarch of Britain) promulgated an order directing that the Lieutenant Colonel of H.M. (Royal British Army) can not be superseded by the East India Company's Indian Army's Lieutenant Colonel. Whenever an Indian Army's Lieutenant Colonel was promoted to Colonel, all the British Army's Lieutenant Colonels who were deployed with the Indian Army and had the equal date and rank with the newly appointed Colonel of Indian Army were also mandatorily given the local Indian Army's honorary rank of Colonel from the date of his Lieutenant Colonelcy with British Army. This unfair system preserved the fictional equivalency of British Army officers with Indian Army officers while denying the officers of the Indian Army their hard-earned honours and ranks within their peculiar service. This was not a reciprocal system, i.e. Lieutenant Colonel of  East India Company (EIC) (Indian Army) were not promoted to Colonels rank when a British Army Lieutenant Colonel of equal date and rank was promoted to Colonel's rank in Indian army. For example, when a ranked Lieutenant Colonel of Bengal Presidency's Indian Army was promoted to Colonel he was ranked 34th on the general list, he superseded 33 other Lieutenant Colonels of Indian Army, along with him all of the British Army's Lieutenant Colonel serving with the Bengal Presidency were also given the honorary rank of Colonel of Bengal Presidency and they superseded 33 Lieutenant Colonels of Indian Army who were their seniors. The army officers of EIC appealed against this derogatory and non-reciprocal system in EIC's Court of Directors. EIC directors had no authority to revoke or amend the order issued by the British monarch.

Retired officers: form of address

On 21 July 2014, the Indian Army issued a circular for retired personnel informing them that the correct form of addressing a retired officer is "Brigadier ABC (Retd) and not Brigadier (Retd) ABC", the correct example is "Brigadier Sant Singh (Retd)". The stated rationale of army was, "Rank never retires, it is an officer who retires." This form of address applies to both living and deceased officers.

See also
 Comparative military ranks
 Air Force ranks and insignia of India
 Naval ranks and insignia of India
 Coast Guard ranks and insignia of India
 Border Roads Organisation ranks and insignia of India
 Paramilitary forces ranks and insignia of India
 Police ranks and insignia of India
 Indian Army cap badges

References

Indian Army
Military ranks of India
India Army